Kijik (Dena'ina: Qizhjeh) is a ghost town in Lake and Peninsula Borough, Alaska, United States.  An Athabascan village that was established on the shores of Lake Clark in the Alaska Range, its population was recorded at 91 in the 1880 United States Census and declined thereafter, falling to approximately 25 individuals by 1904.  Today, the village has been abandoned.  The ghost town is located within the bounds of Lake Clark National Park and Preserve.

The historic portion of the village was the subject of archaeological and ethnological research in the 1960s.  Interviews with Dena'ina elders in Nondalton established that the people of Kijik relocated to Old Nondalton (not far from present-day Nondalton) in the early 20th century, probably to be closer to trading posts and the canneries of Bristol Bay.  A survey expedition that visited the site in 1909 reported it to be abandoned.  A major archaeological excavation of the historic village took place in 1966, exposing twelve foundational remnants of log houses (many of the houses having apparently been moved to Old Nondalton at the time of the relocation), and two of what appeared to be larger communal structures.

In 1979, twelve acres of the village site were added to the National Register of Historic Places as a historic district.  A much larger area, encompassing a significant number of archaeological sites related to the habitation and use of the area from at least the 12th century forward, was designated a National Historic Landmark District in 1994, for the unique concentration of sites related to the inland Dena'ina people.

The community was known by many other names than "Kijik" during its history, including "Lake Clark Village", "Nijik", "Nikhkak", "Nikhak", and "Old Keegik".  Its current name has been spelled in a wide variety of ways, including "Keechik", "Keeghik", "Keejik", "Keggik", "Keygik", "Kichak", "Kichik", "Kilchik", and "Kilchikh".

Demographics

Kijik first appeared on the 1880 U.S. Census as the unincorporated Tinneh village of "Kichik." It appeared again on the 1890 U.S. Census as "Nikhkak." It has not reported since and was abandoned after 1900.

See also
List of National Historic Landmarks in Alaska
National Register of Historic Places listings in Lake and Peninsula Borough, Alaska
National Register of Historic Places listings in Lake Clark National Park and Preserve

References

Geography of Lake and Peninsula Borough, Alaska
Ghost towns in Alaska
Inuit history
National Historic Landmarks in Alaska
Buildings and structures in Lake and Peninsula Borough, Alaska
Native American history of Alaska
Historic districts on the National Register of Historic Places in Alaska
National Register of Historic Places in Lake and Peninsula Borough, Alaska
Populated places on the National Register of Historic Places in Alaska
Archaeological sites on the National Register of Historic Places in Alaska
National Register of Historic Places in Lake Clark National Park and Preserve
Ghost towns in the United States
Ghost towns in North America
Towns in the United States